The 1930 Hong Kong Sanitary Board election was supposed to be held on 8 December 1930 for the one of the two unofficial seats in the Sanitary Board of Hong Kong.

Only ratepayers who were included in the Special and Common Jury Lists of the years or ratepayers who are exempted from serving on Juries on account of their professional avocations, unofficial members of the Executive or Legislative Council, or categories of profession were entitled to vote at the election.

Dr. Roberto Alexandre de Castro Basto was elected without being contested, replacing the other Portuguese board member José Pedro Braga.

References
 Endacott, G. B. Government and people in Hong Kong, 1841-1962 : a constitutional history Hong Kong University Press. (1964) 
 The Hong Kong Government Gazette

Hong Kong
1930 in Hong Kong
Sanitary
Uncontested elections
December 1930 events
1930 elections in the British Empire